Shinigami Eyes may refer to:

 Shinigami Eyes, a plot device in the manga Death Note
 "Shinigami Eyes" (song), by Grimes, 2022